Praestigia is a genus of sheet weavers that was first described by Alfred Frank Millidge in 1954.

The defining characteristic of Praestigia is a projection issuing from the ocular region in males, which varies in form depending on the species, and bears a cap at its distal end. The cap is composed of a series of interconnected fibers glued to the projection with a waxy substance. The cap itself is easily dislodged and lost, and where it originates from is unclear.

The generic name is a combination of Latin prae, meaning "in front" or "before" and Greek stigios, meaning "an awl," a reference to the above-described projection.

Species
 it contains eight species:
Praestigia duffeyi Millidge, 1954 (type) – Europe
Praestigia eskovi Marusik, Gnelitsa & Koponen, 2008 – Russia
Praestigia groenlandica Holm, 1967 – Canada, Greenland
Praestigia kulczynskii Eskov, 1979 – Russia, Japan, Canada
Praestigia makarovae Marusik, Gnelitsa & Koponen, 2008 – Russia
Praestigia pini (Holm, 1950) – Sweden, Finland, Russia, Mongolia
Praestigia sibirica Marusik, Gnelitsa & Koponen, 2008 – Russia, USA (Alaska)
Praestigia uralensis Marusik, Gnelitsa & Koponen, 2008 – Russia

See also
 List of Linyphiidae species (I–P)

References

Araneomorphae genera
Linyphiidae
Spiders of Asia
Spiders of North America